Björn Thomas Lilius (born 2 June 1970) is a Swedish former footballer who played as a defender. He represented Sweden at the 1992 Summer Olympics. He also played for domestic Swedish football clubs such as Malmö FF, Helsingborgs IF and Östers IF.

References

External links 
 Sports reference

1970 births
Living people
Swedish footballers
Association football midfielders
Sweden youth international footballers
Olympic footballers of Sweden
Footballers at the 1992 Summer Olympics
Malmö FF players
Helsingborgs IF players
Östers IF players
Sportspeople from Helsingborg